Fortieth term for President of the United States may refer to:
 The Fourth term and death (1945) of Franklin D. Roosevelt
 The First term (1945–1949) of Harry S. Truman